Raniel Santana de Vasconcelos  (born 11 June 1996), simply known as Raniel, is a Brazilian professional footballer who plays as a forward.

Club career

Santa Cruz
Born in Recife, Pernambuco, Raniel started his career at futsal before moving to football, and was a Santa Cruz youth graduate. He made his first team debut on 9 March 2014, coming on as a second-half substitute for Carlos Alberto in a 7–0 home routing of Salgueiro.

Raniel made his Série B debut on 19 April 2014, starting in a 1–1 home draw against ABC. On 21 July, he was preventively suspended for 30 days after failing a doping exam; the substance was later revealed to be cocaine.

Raniel was suspended for one year in November 2014, but he was able to play due to preliminary injunctions. He scored his first senior goal the following 21 March, netting the opener in a 3–0 home defeat of Serra Talhada.

In May 2015, Raniel was again suspended, being out of action until September. On 25 September, shortly after returning, he was suspended by FIFA until the following February, but Santa Cruz managed to overturn the decision in October.

Cruzeiro
On 19 March 2016, Santa Cruz agreed to loan Raniel to Cruzeiro, starting the following May, until December. Initially assigned to the under-20s, he was bought outright in January 2017.

Raniel made his first team debut for Cruzeiro on 5 February 2017, starting in a 2–1 home win against Tricordiano for the Campeonato Mineiro championship. His Série A debut occurred on 14 May, as he replaced goalscorer Ramón Ábila in a 1–0 home success over São Paulo.

Raniel scored his first goal for Raposa on 20 August 2017, netting the last of a 2–0 home win against Sport. The following 13 March, he renewed his contract until 2022.

São Paulo
On 5 July 2019, Raniel signed a five-year contract with fellow top tier club São Paulo. He made his debut for the club eight days later in a 1–1 home draw against Palmeiras, and scored his first goal in a 4–0 away routing of Chapecoense.

Santos
On 11 December 2019, Raniel agreed to a four-year deal with Santos, with Vitor Bueno moving in the opposite direction. He made his debut for the club the following 23 January, replacing Kaio Jorge at half-time in a 0–0 Campeonato Paulista home draw against Red Bull Bragantino.

Raniel scored his first goals for Peixe on 30 January 2020, netting a brace in a 2–0 home defeat of Inter de Limeira. He tested positive for COVID-19 in September, subsequently recovered, but in October contracted thrombosis in his right leg; the disease was also linked as a consequence of the COVID.

On 10 July 2021, after more than a year without playing, Raniel returned to action after coming on as a late substitute in a 2–3 away loss against Palmeiras.

On 4 January 2022, Raniel joined Vasco da Gama on loan until the end of the year. He helped the side in their return to the top tier with ten goals, and returned to his parent club in December.

Back to Santos for the 2023 season, Raniel was registered for the 2023 Campeonato Paulista after a request by head coach Odair Hellmann. On 13 March, after only featuring twice, he rescinded his contract.

Career statistics

Honours

Club
Santa Cruz
Campeonato Pernambucano: 2015, 2016
Copa do Nordeste: 2016

Cruzeiro
Copa do Brasil: 2017, 2018
Campeonato Mineiro: 2018, 2019

Individual
Campeonato Pernambucano Best Newcomer: 2015

References

External links

1996 births
Living people
Brazilian footballers
Association football forwards
Campeonato Brasileiro Série A players
Campeonato Brasileiro Série B players
Santa Cruz Futebol Clube players
Cruzeiro Esporte Clube players
São Paulo FC players
Santos FC players
CR Vasco da Gama players
Doping cases in association football
Brazilian sportspeople in doping cases
Sportspeople from Recife